Sir Lionel Arthur Lindsay (17 October 187422 May 1961) was an Australian artist, known for his paintings and etchings.

Early life

Lindsay was born in the Victorian town of Creswick, into a creative family – he was the brother of artist Norman Lindsay and artist and critic Daryl Lindsay and of the relatively unknown artists Ruby Lindsay and Percy Lindsay. Lionel became a pupil-assistant at the Melbourne Observatory (1889–1892) and later studied at the National Gallery School, Melbourne and in George Coates' rooms.

Lindsay taught himself etching and engraving in the 1890s while a student, immediately prior to his first trip to Spain and England. On his return to Australia he settled in Sydney as a freelance artist and journalist, contributing to The Bulletin and other magazines and newspapers.

He married Jean, a sister of the literary Dyson boys (Ted, Will, and Ambrose), while Will married Lionel's sister Ruby.

Career

Lindsay was good friends with Ernest Moffitt and published a book on his art, A Consideration of the Art of Ernest Moffitt (1899). In 1907 he held an extremely successful exhibition of etchings in Sydney with the Society of Artists.  The two decades after 1907 saw him active with the Society of Artists and in 1921, when the Australian Painter-Etchers' Society was formed, Lindsay was its first president. He began to exhibit in London in 1923 and had his most successful exhibition of that period at Colnaghi, a London art dealer, in 1927. Colnaghi's Galleries and the critic Harold Wright led British interest in Lindsay's work and guaranteed his reputation as a major British printmaker and watercolourist.

Key themes in his oeuvre include the swagman in the outback, old Sydney, portraits of prominent Australians, romantic views of Spain and Arab culture, a series of classically inspired works and birds and animals.

In 1937 Lindsay became a foundation member of, and exhibited with, Robert Menzies' anti-modernist organisation, the Australian Academy of Art.Lindsay became a Trustee of the Art Gallery of New South Wales and was knighted for his services to Australian art in 1941. In 1942 Lindsay published Addled Art, a vituperative and anti-semitic attack on modernism in art. Lindsay's views on modernism, however, were not as clear cut as Addled Art would have it seem: for example, Lindsay supported William Dobell during the court case over his Archibald Prize-winning portrait of Joshua Smith.

Death
Lindsay died in Melbourne on 22 May 1961. His autobiography, Comedy of Life, was published posthumously.

Legacy
The Lionel Lindsay Art Gallery and Library, in Toowoomba, Queensland, holds rare books, manuscripts and maps, and over 400 art works by members of the Lindsay family and other significant Australian painters, including Frederick McCubbin, Arthur Streeton, Tom Roberts and Rupert Bunny.  The library and gallery was established by local transport owner and philanthropist Bill Bolton MBE (1905–1973).

Publications
 Lionel Lindsay, A book of woodcuts, drawn on wood and engraved (Sydney: Art in Australia; London: Constable, 1922).
 Lionel Lindsay, Twenty-one woodcuts (Sydney: Meryon Press, 1924).
 Lionel Lindsay, Etchings & drypoints of Spain & Australia (London: Colnaghi, 1927).
 Sydney Ure Smith and Leon Gellert (eds.), The art of Lionel Lindsay (Sydney: Art in Australia, 1928).
 Lionel Lindsay, Drawing and drawings in Australia (Sydney: Fairfax, 1937).
 Lionel Lindsay, Addled art (Sydney: Angus and Robertson, 1942).
 Lionel Lindsay, Comedy of life: an autobiography, 1874-1961 (Sydney: Angus & Robertson, 1967).
 Lionel Lindsay, A Consideration of the Art of Ernest Moffitt.
 Joanna Mendelssohn, The art of Sir Lionel Lindsay. Volume 1. Woodcuts (Brookvale, N.S.W.: Copperfield Publishing Co., c1982).
 Joanna Mendelssohn, The art of Sir Lionel Lindsay. Volume II (Brookvale, N.S.W.: Copperfield, c1987).

References

Bernard Smith, 'Lindsay, Sir Lionel Arthur (1874 - 1961)', Australian Dictionary of Biography, Volume 10, MUP, 1986, pp 106–115.

External links

 Linsday's works in the National Library of Australia, Canberra
 Lindsay's works in the National Gallery of Australia, Canberra
 Lionel Lindsay Art Gallery and Library, Toowoomba
 Biography, Josef Lebovic Gallery, Sydney
 [CC-By-SA]

1874 births
1961 deaths
Australian etchers
People from Creswick, Victoria
Australian Knights Bachelor
20th-century Australian painters
20th-century Australian male artists
Lionel
20th-century printmakers
Australian male painters
Artists from Victoria (Australia)
National Gallery of Victoria Art School alumni